Nonnenbach is a river of Baden-Württemberg and Bavaria, Germany. It is a tributary of Lake Constance, which is drained by the Rhine, near Kressbronn am Bodensee.

See also
List of rivers of Baden-Württemberg
List of rivers of Bavaria

References

Rivers of Baden-Württemberg
Rivers of Bavaria
Rivers of Germany